Denatay Heard (born March 18, 1984) is a former cornerback in the Canadian Football League. He signed with the Edmonton Eskimos on June 4, 2012, and was released on June 12, 2012. He played college football at Stillman.

References

External links
Edmonton Eskimos bio

1984 births
Living people
American players of Canadian football
Canadian football defensive backs
Edmonton Elks players
People from LaGrange, Georgia
Saskatchewan Roughriders players
Stillman Tigers football players
Toronto Argonauts players